Il mondo in un secondo  is the second Alessandra Amoroso's album. The album was released on July 15, 2010. The album consists of thirteen tracks recorded in the spring and summer 2010. It was certified quadruple platinum by the Federation of the Italian Music Industry.

Track listing

Charts

Singles

References

2010 albums
Alessandra Amoroso albums
Sony Music Italy albums